Elmaz is a masculine given name. Notable people with the name include:

Elmaz Abinader (born 1954), Arab-American author, poet, and academic 
Elmaz Boçe (1852–1925), Albanian educator

See also
Elmas (surname)

Masculine given names